Fazlallah, also spelled Fadlallah, Fazlollah, Fazlullah etc.) is a male Muslim given name, composed of the elements Fadl and Allah, meaning bounty of God. In modern usage it may serve as a surname. It may refer to:

Given name
 Fazlallah Astarabadi (Naimi) (1340–1394), Azerbaijani mystic, the leader of the Hurifis
 Fazlullah Mojadeddi (1957–2021), Afghan fighter and politician
 Fazlullah MPA (born 1980), Pakistani politician
 Sheikh Fazlollah Noori (1843–1909), Iranian Shiite cleric, executed for treason
 Fazlollah Reza (1915–2019), Iranian university professor of engineering
 Fazlullah Wahidi (born 1951), Afghan social worker and politician
 Fazlollah Zahedi (ca. 1897–1963), Iranian general and statesman

Surname 
 Hassan Fadlallah (born 1967), Lebanese politician
 Mahmoud Abdel Razek Fadlallah, known as Shikabala (born 1986), Egyptian footballer
 Mohammad Hussein Fadlallah (1935–2010), Lebanese Grand Ayatollah
 Maulana Fazlullah (1974–2018), leader of a banned Pakistani Islamic fundamentalist militant group
 Qazi Fazlullah Ubaidullah (fl. 1950), Pakistani politician
 Qazi Fazl Ullah, Pakistani Islamic scholar based in the United States
 Shamsi Fazlollahi (born 1941), Iranian actress
 Sylvie Fadlallah (born 1948), Lebanese diplomat
 Wardina Safiyyah Fadlullah Wilmot (born 1979), Malaysian actress, model and host

Arabic masculine given names
Surnames of Lebanese origin
Surnames of Iranian origin